Umm al-Nasr Mosque or Beit Hanoun Mosque is the oldest mosque in the Palestinian city of Beit Hanoun in the Gaza Strip, located in the center of the city.

History
The Umm al-Nasr Mosque was built 1239 by the Ayyubids to commemorate their soldiers who had died in the battle on the mosque site between them and the Crusaders. The Ayyubids were victorious, hence the name Umm al-Nasr ("Mother of Victories"). The inscription on the wall above the mosque entrance attributes the construction to Ayyubid sultan al-Adil II. 

The battle that is commemorated was not a major one, but in the history of later Crusades it was significant. Egyptian historian al-Maqrizi mentions that the battle occurred on November 13, 1239 and ended in an Egyptian (Ayyubid) victory. Crusader reports confirm al-Maqrizi's claim that Henry the Count of Bar, together with 1,000 of his men were killed in the hostilities, and 600 were taken prisoner, most of whom were killed by their captors on the way to Egypt. 

On November 3, 2006, Israeli forces and Palestinian militants holed up inside the mosque exchanged gunfire. The mosque was virtually destroyed by Israeli shells, the only structure untouched being the southern portico a shallow dome in the mosque center. Nearly 40 women marching to protect the mosque were shot at by Israelis, resulting in the deaths of two. The damage to the mosque was condemned by the United Nations.

Architecture
The original mosque consisted of one large room, with a simple dome, built from crude and worn-out stones. Nothing is left of the original mosque apart from the southern portico with its roof—which consists of fan vaults and shallow dome in the center. The prayer hall ends with a room to the east roofed with a dome supported on spherical triangles. The foundation plate is inscribed in Ayyubid  nashki script.

References

Further reading	

  

Mosques completed in 1239
13th-century mosques
Mosques in the Gaza Strip
Beit Hanoun